Philip Schniter from  Ohio State University, Columbus, OH was named Fellow of the Institute of Electrical and Electronics Engineers (IEEE) in 2014 for contributions to signal processing in communications.

References

Fellow Members of the IEEE
Living people
1970 births
Cornell University alumni
Place of birth missing (living people)
American electrical engineers